Jogen Gogoi (born 1922) was an Indian politician and leader of Communist Party of India. He represented Thowra constituency in the Assam Legislative Assembly from 1978 to 1983.

References

1922 births
Possibly living people
Assam MLAs 1978–1983
Communist Party of India politicians from Assam